Steve McGiffin (born 16 April 1997) (also known as 'steej' or 'Stiffmiester') is an Australian cricket player from the Western Suburbs of Brisbane. On 6 January 2022, McGiffin was added to the Brisbane Heat squad for the 2021-22 Big Bash League season after 12 players were ruled out with COVID-19. He made his Twenty20 debut for the Brisbane Heat against the Melbourne Renegades on 6 January 2022 at GMHBA Stadium. On 26 February 2023, he made his List A debut for the Queensland against the New South Wales in the 2022–23 Marsh One-Day Cup.

References

1997 births
Living people
Brisbane Heat cricketers
Australian cricketers